The Nairobi Railway Museum is a railway museum in Nairobi, Kenya, adjacent to Nairobi railway station. Containing exhibits from the defunct East African Railways, it was opened in 1971 by East African Railways and Harbours Corporation. It is operated by Kenya Railways.

The museum has maintained its rail connection. This allows for the efficient movement of museum exhibits for maintenance and placing items in the collection.

The three operational steam locomotives are stored securely under cover within the main railway works. Visitors must request an appointment to view them. They have not been used for several years. One of the display locomotives, 301 (2301) was used in the 1985 movie, Out of Africa.

The museum's collection also includes early diesel locomotives and passenger coaches. Friends of the Railway Museum East Africa (FORM East Africa), a concern encompassing Railway and Locomotive enthusiasts, has assisted in sourcing and securing artifacts for the museum.

In January 2011, a working miniature railway was installed to enhance activity at the museum. This miniature train was formerly used to promote Kenya Railways (KR) on exhibitions, such as the Nairobi Show. It consists of a locomotive with a petrol-engine, and several coaches made of wood.

Exhibited locomotives 
The museum exhibits a number of engines, including:

The museum's WG Bagnall engine, Hugh F Marriott, was built in Stafford, England, in 1951. It operated as a switcher at the Magadi Soda Company until 1970. In 2020, it was moved to a display outside Nairobi railway station. *301 was used in the 1985 movie  Out of Africa.

References

External links 

 Nairobi Railway Museum, Facebook page

Museums in Kenya
Buildings and structures in Nairobi
Rail transport in Kenya
Railway museums in Kenya
National railway museums
Transport in Nairobi
Tourist attractions in Nairobi